The 2002 NCAA Division I-AA Football Championship Game was a postseason college football game between the Western Kentucky Hilltoppers and the McNeese State Cowboys. The game was played on December 20, 2002, at Finley Stadium, home field of the University of Tennessee at Chattanooga. The culminating game of the 2002 NCAA Division I-AA football season, it was won by Western Kentucky, 34–14.

Teams
The participants of the Championship Game were the finalists of the 2002 I-AA Playoffs, which began with a 16-team bracket.

Western Kentucky Hilltoppers

Western Kentucky started their season with a loss to Kansas State of Division I-A, and the team was 2–3 after their first five games. They then won six games in a row, to finish their regular season with an 8–3 record (7–1 in conference). Unseeded in the playoffs, the Hilltoppers defeated Murray State, second-seed Western Illinois, and third-seed Georgia Southern to reach the final. This was the first appearance for Western Kentucky in a Division I-AA championship game.

McNeese State Cowboys

McNeese State finished their regular season with a 9–1 record (6–0 in conference); their only loss was to Nebraska of Division I-A. The Cowboys, seeded first in the tournament, defeated Montana State, Montana, and Villanova to reach the final. This was the second appearance for McNeese State in a Division I-AA championship game, having lost in 1997.

Game summary

Scoring summary

Game statistics

References

Further reading

External links
 Western Kentucky Vs Mcneese State 2002 via YouTube

Championship Game
NCAA Division I Football Championship Games
McNeese Cowboys football games
Western Kentucky Hilltoppers football games
College football in Tennessee
American football competitions in Chattanooga, Tennessee
NCAA Division I-AA Football Championship Game
NCAA Division I-AA Football Championship Game